Mary Marguerite Potter (24 March 1905 – 9 September 1990), known professionally as Molly Adair, was an English stage and silent screen actress. She was married to Arthur James Siggins, a policeman who later became a writer, from New Zealand. She was the mother of the actress Jill Adams.  Adair was of Irish-American descent.

Selected filmography

References

External links
 

1905 births
1990 deaths
English film actresses
20th-century English actresses
English silent film actresses
English stage actresses
English people of Irish descent
English people of American descent